Richard Edmunds (born August 1, 1947) is an American rower. He competed in the men's coxed pair event at the 1968 Summer Olympics.

References

1947 births
Living people
American male rowers
Olympic rowers of the United States
Rowers at the 1968 Summer Olympics
People from Springville, New York